The #1s and #2s: The Best of Buddy Goode is the first compilation album by Michael Carr's comedy character Buddy Goode. It was officially released both digitally and on CD in stores on 1 August 2014.

The album contains a selection of tracks from Goode's first four studio album — It's All Goode, The One and Only Buddy Goode, Unappropriate and It's a Buddy Goode Christmas. In addition to these previously released tracks, two previously unreleased bonus tracks were included—"Bro Country" and "I Just Let One Go".

Track listing

References

External links
Official website
CD edition
iTunes edition

Buddy Goode albums
2014 compilation albums